Villa Tehuelches is a Chilean village (pop. 151) and capital of the commune of Laguna Blanca in the Magallanes Province, Magallanes and Antartica Chilena Region. This area of Patagonian plains is suitable for livestock and the breeding of sheep.

History 
The municipality was created on 30 December 1927 with the name of Morro Chico, renaming reformulation of borders, of agreement, Decree No. 2868, 26.10.1979.

Community activities 
Offers educational services, which is taught in school, "Diego Portales", whose director is Doris Montiel Quedimán, who also administers the internship for students coming from different sectors, both of Laguna Blanca as other municipalities and provinces (Punta Arenas, Río Verde, Chile, Puerto Aysén, Puerto Natales)

Also enjoy access to emergency health care through a first aid post, which is in charge of university nurse Patricia Obilinovic

Finally, the order and security of the township lies in the police station in Villa Tehuelches, whose Chief Officer checkpoint is Osvaldo Ferreira.

References

External links 
Map
Villa Tehuelche

Port settlements in Chile
Populated places in Magallanes Province